The two  (Thou wilt sprinkle me), WAB 3, are sacred motets composed by Anton Bruckner. They are settings of the Latin Asperges me, the antiphon used for the celebration of Asperges.

History 
In 1844/1845, Bruckner composed these two settings of Aperges me during his stay in Kronstorf. They were presumably performed at that time.

The manuscripts are stored in the Österreichische Nationalbibliothek. The two motets were first published in band II/2, pp. 67–76 of the Göllerich/Auer biography.

Music 
During his stay in Kronstorf Bruckner, composed these two settings of the Asperges me for mixed choir and organ (1844/1845). As for the former Asperges me, the incipit ("Asperges me") is not composed and has to be intoned by the priest in Gregorian mode before the choir is going on. It is the first composition, at the end of which Bruckner has put his signature.

Asperges me, WAB 3.1 
The work, a setting of 58 bars in Aeolian mode, was composed for the Asperges of Septuagesima Sunday till the 4th Sunday of Lent.

The score is in three parts. Part 1 (19 bars), which begins with "Domine, hysopo" and ends with "dealbabor", is in fugato. Part 2 (25 bars), which follows with the remaining of the text and the doxology till ("Spiritui Sancto"), is sung in unison with organ accompaniment. Part 3 (14 bars), which begins in canon, goes on till the end of the doxology.

Asperges me, WAB 3.2 
The work, a setting of 41 bars in F major was composed for the Asperges of Passion Sunday, does not include the doxology.

The score is in three parts. Part 1 (16 bars), sung in homophony, begins with "Domine, hysopo" and ends with "dealbabor". Part 2 (7 bars) follows with the remaining of the text a cappella in Gregorian mode. After a repeat of the incipit (2 bars), part 3 is a modified repeat of the first part.

Discography

Asperges me, WAB 3.1
There is only one commercial recording in full accordance with the score:
 Erwin Ortner, Arnold Schoenberg Chor, Anton Bruckner: Tantum ergo - CD: ASC Edition 3,ssue of the choir, 2008

Asperges me, WAB 3.2 
There is only one commercial recording:
 Balduin Sulzer, Chor des Musikgymnasiums Linz, Musik aus der Stifterstraße – LP: Extempore AD-80.01/2, 1980 (sung fully a cappella)

References

Sources 
 August Göllerich, Anton Bruckner. Ein Lebens- und Schaffens-Bild,  – posthumous edited by Max Auer by G. Bosse, Regensburg, 1932
 James Garrat, Palestrina and the German Romantic Imagination, Cambridge University Press, Cambridge, 2004. 
 Anton Bruckner – Sämtliche Werke, Band XXI: Kleine Kirchenmusikwerke, Musikwissenschaftlicher Verlag der Internationalen Bruckner-Gesellschaft, Hans Bauernfeind and Leopold Nowak (Editor), Vienna, 1984/2001
 Cornelis van Zwol, Anton Bruckner 1824–1896 – Leven en werken, uitg. Thoth, Bussum, Netherlands, 2012. 
 Uwe Harten, Anton Bruckner. Ein Handbuch. , Salzburg, 1996. .

External links 
 
  
 Asperges aeolisch, WAB 3/1 and Asperges F-Dur, WAB 3/2 - Critical discography by Hans Roelofs 
 A life performance of the Asperges me, WAB 3.2 by Gian Michele Cavallo with the Corale Valli di Lanzo can be heard on YouTube: A. Bruckner: Asperges me - at 0:48

Motets by Anton Bruckner
1845 compositions
Compositions in F major